Ruru Crests are two parallel rock ridges 2.2 nautical miles (4.1 km) northwest of the summit of Mount Bird, Ross Island. The feature rises to c.1400 m. It is one of several landmarks near Mount Bird assigned the native name of a New Zealand mountain bird. Named by New Zealand Geographic Board (NZGB), 2000.
 

Ridges of Ross Island